John Patrick Gilligan (born John Peter Gilgen, October 18, 1885 – November 19, 1980) was an American Major League Baseball pitcher.

External links
Baseball Reference.com

1885 births
1980 deaths
American expatriate baseball players in Canada
St. Louis Browns players
Major League Baseball pitchers
Vancouver Beavers players
Milwaukee Brewers (minor league) players
Minneapolis Millers (baseball) players
Portland Beavers players
Sacramento Sacts players
San Francisco Seals (baseball) players
Des Moines Boosters players
Salt Lake City Bees players
Seattle Rainiers players
Baseball players from Chicago